Flagstaff Lake is one of a group of interconnected, alkaline, high-desert lakes known as the Warner Lakes in the Warner Valley of Lake County in the U.S. state of Oregon.

The Warner Lakes vary in depth and volume depending on the weather and have completely dried up at times. Fish populations also vary. During a drought from 1988 to 1992, when all of the lakes went dry, some fish survived by retreating into a  slough connected to the lakes. Historically, fish species in the lakes have included crappie, brown bullhead, largemouth bass, and redband trout.

See also 
 List of lakes in Oregon

References

Lakes of Oregon
Wetlands of Oregon
Lakes of Lake County, Oregon
Bureau of Land Management areas in Oregon
Protected areas of Lake County, Oregon
Endorheic lakes of Oregon